John Kinder (17 September 1819 5 September 1903) was a New Zealand Anglican clergyman, teacher, artist and photographer.

Life 
Kinder was born in London, United Kingdom, on 17 September 1819, the oldest surviving child of a wealthy merchant and his second wife. In 1838 Kinder attended Cambridge University originally studying Mathematics but Classics and Theology were where his true interests lay. He graduated in 1845 with a MA. While at Cambridge he joined the Cambridge Camden Society which was a group interested in church architecture. Kinder received his Anglican priesthood in 1845 and became an ordained deacon in 1846. In 1848, Kinder was the new Master at Alleyne's Grammar School where he remained for eight years. However, after he was petitioned to be removed from his post due to his strict religious practices, he was interviewed by Bishop G. A Selwyn to relocate to Auckland, New Zealand to be the headmaster of the Church of England Grammar School. Kinder began his journey to New Zealand in July 1855. He moved into the headmasters house across the road from the school which is now a heritage site known as Kinder House. During the New Zealand Land Wars of the 1860s, Kinder was a Chaplain to the British Forces. In 1872, Kinder became the Master of St John's College in Tamaki. Kinder received a Doctor of Divinity in 1873 by the Archbishop of Canterbury.

In December 1859, at Te Papa in Tauranga, Kinder married Marianne Celia Brown.  The couple had no children of their own, but they adopted Kinder's youngest brother's children after he was murdered in 1865.

Painting and photography 
While most of Kinder's life was devoted to theology and education, he became known after his death as an artist and photographer. Most of his work centred around landscape and architectural portraits. He is particularly known for his water colour paintings. One of his most well known photographic works was the portrait of Wiremu Tamihana, which was used as the front cover of the 1864 book, The Maori King by John Gorst. Kinder's photographs of Parnell in the 1860s have been preserved as a historical record of colonial Auckland. His works as an artist and photographer have only been exhibited on a few occasions. They were first shown in 1871 and again 1873 by the Auckland Society of Artists of which Kinder was a founding member.

Death and legacy 

Kinder died on 5 September 1903, aged 83, in Remuera, Auckland, and was buried at St John's College. The John Kinder Theological Library is the library and archives for St John's College as well as for the Anglican Church in Aotearoa New Zealand and Polynesia.

From September 2013 to April 2014, Kinder was the subject of an exhibition at the Auckland Art Gallery titled Kinder's Presence.

A topographical map of Auckland which Kinder drew is now held in the Hocken Library in Dunedin.

References

External links 

 Works of Kinder are held in the collection of Auckland War Memorial Museum Tamaki Paenga Hira

1819 births
1903 deaths
New Zealand artists
New Zealand educators
New Zealand photographers
19th-century New Zealand Anglican priests
Anglican clergy from London
English emigrants to New Zealand
Photographers from Auckland